The 1944 New Zealand rugby league season was the 37th season of rugby league that had been played in New Zealand.

International competitions

New Zealand played in no international matches due to World War II.

National competitions

Northern Union Cup
West Coast again held the Northern Union Cup at the end of the season.

Inter-district competition
The West Coast defeated Canterbury 23-18.

Club competitions

Auckland

City won the Auckland Rugby League's Fox Memorial Trophy, Rukutai Shield and Stormont Shield. Ponsonby won the Roope Rooster.

Wellington
Randwick won the Wellington Rugby League's Appleton Shield.

Canterbury
Addington won the Canterbury Rugby League's Massetti Cup.

The competition consisted of Hornby, Linwood, Addington, Riccarton, Sydenham-Rakaia and Woolston-Hollywood.

Addington defeated Blackball 11-10 to win the Thacker Shield and also defeated Randwick 19-18.

Other Competitions

References

Rugby league season